Hurricane Ella was the second of two major hurricanes to threaten Texas during the 1970 Atlantic hurricane season. The sixth tropical storm and third hurricane of the season, Ella developed on September 8 in the western Caribbean Sea. It moved across the Yucatán Peninsula as a tropical depression before rapidly intensifying into a hurricane in the Gulf of Mexico. Initially the hurricane was forecast to hit southern Texas, which prompted evacuations and hurricane warnings. This occurred about a month after Hurricane Celia caused significant damage across the region. Hurricane Ella ultimately turned to the west and maintained a track that spared Texas from significant impact. The hurricane left one death due to a destroyed house. Ella weakened while moving inland and dissipated on September 13.

Meteorological history

The origins of Hurricane Ella were from a well-defined trough that extended from the San Andres archipelago to Florida in early September. A tropical depression developed from the system on September 8 near Swan Island off the north coast of Honduras. Moving northwestward, the depression failed to strengthen much before striking the Yucatán Peninsula on September 10, just south of Cozumel. As it emerged into the Gulf of Mexico, the depression began to intensify significantly. A few hours later, the Hurricane Hunters observed a tropical storm, which prompted the system being named "Ella". Around that time, the storm started a general curve toward the west, due to a ridge to its north. With an anticyclone aloft providing favorable conditions, Ella rapidly intensified into a hurricane less than 12 hours after emerging from the Yucatán Peninsula.

Initially there was uncertainty in its future track, and the hurricane posed a threat to Texas; however, Ella turned to the west as its intensification rate slowed. About 24 hours before its final landfall, its center became trackable on radar from Brownsville, Texas. As the ridge to the north weakened, Ella slowed its forward motion markedly and quickly strengthened. This made Ella one of eleven major hurricanes to strike the Atlantic coast of Mexico in the period between 1970 and 2008. It rapidly weakened over land, dissipating early on September 13 over western Nuevo León.

Preparations and impact

When Hurricane Ella was still moving to the west-northwest, the Weather Bureau issued a hurricane watch for the entire Texas coastline. This was later upgraded to a hurricane warning from Brownsville to Port Isabel, with gale warnings extending northward to Port Aransas. Officials issued a mandatory evacuation for low-lying areas around Brownsville, as well as in South Padre Island and Port Isabel. An American Red Cross shelter opened to provide shelter. All residents in mobile homes were also told to leave their homes in the Brownsville area. People in the affected area took extra precautions due to the heavy damage left by Hurricane Celia only weeks before.

The hurricane increased surf along the Texas coast, with wave heights of  observed. As a result, small craft were recommended to remain at port. Ultimately there was no reported storm surge in Texas, although the waves crested high along the beaches. Observations in northeastern Mexico were sparse, although wind gusts from Ella reached . There, the rainfall disrupted post-storm rescue work. The rains prevented the transportation of relief goods, including food and medicine, by helicopters. The hurricane destroyed several houses, and there was one death after a girl was stuck in her destroyed house in Abasolo. Due to the hurricane, the Purification and the San Fernando Rivers crested above flood stage.

See also

Other storms named Ella

References

Ella
Ella (1970)
Ella (1970)